Georges Aristide Claude Félix Rivière (born 1 July 1924) is a French retired actor who worked in Argentine cinema in the 1950s. He appeared in nearly 50 films between 1948 and 1970.

Selected filmography

The Lame Devil (1948) – Marquis de la Tour de Bournac
The Black Vampire (1953) – Presumed guilty
Mujeres casadas (1954)
En carne viva (1954)
Pájaros de cristal (1955) – Miguel Legrand – Mitia
La delatora (1955)
Bacará (1955)
Mi marido y mi novio (1955)
De noche también se duerme (1955)
Alejandra (1956)
La dama del millón (1956)
Susana y yo (1957) – Arturo Hernán
Las campanas de Teresa (1957)
Cargaison blanche (1958) – Raymond
El calavera (1958)
Un centavo de mujer (1958)
Houla Houla (1959) – Dr. Gilbert Rousset
Asphalte (1959) – Roger
John Paul Jones (1959) – Russian chamberlain
Visa pour l'enfer (1959) – Mario Balducci
Normandie-Niémen (1960) – Le lieutenant Benoît
Mistress of the World (1960) – Logan
Tomorrow Is My Turn (1960) – Jean
An American in Toledo (1960) – Arthur
Crimen (1960) – Gaston Le Duke – Eleonora's Lover
Journey Beneath the Desert (1961) – John
The Last Judgment (1961) – Gianni
Mörderspiel (1961) – Dahlberg
The Game of Truth (1961) – Bertrand Falaise
La Fayette (1962) – Vergennes
Le Dernier Quart d'heure (1962) – L'inspecteur Bart
The Longest Day (1962) – Sgt. Guy de Montlaur
 Mandrin (1962) – Mandrin
The Four Musketeers (1963) – D'Artagnan
 The Accident (1963) – Julien
Horror Castle (1963) – Max Hunter
Le commissaire mène l'enquête (1963) – (segment "Pour qui sonne le ...")
Anatomy of a Marriage: My Days with Jean-Marc (1964) – Philippe
Anatomy of a Marriage: My Days with Françoise (1964) – Philippe
Castle of Blood (1964) – Alan Foster
Minnesota Clay (1964) – Fox
The Glass Cage (1965) – Claude
Agent 3S3: Passport to Hell (1965) – Professor Steve Dickson
La donnaccia (1965)
Les Chiens dans la nuit (1965) – Giorgos
Run, Psycho, Run (1968) – Dr. Boyd
Piège blond (1970) – Hugo

References

External links

1924 births
Possibly living people
20th-century French male actors
Expatriate male actors in Argentina
French expatriates in Argentina
French male film actors
People from Tahiti